Thomas Solomon  is Professor of Neurology, director of the Institute of Infection and Global Health at the University of Liverpool, and director of the National Institute for Health and Care Research (NIHR) Health Protection Research Unit in Emerging and Zoonotic Infections. In 2021 he was elected Fellow of the UK Academy of Medical Sciences.

He is a specialist in the study of emerging viruses, especially those which infect the brain. He heads the Liverpool Brain Infections Group, which studies encephalitis (inflammation and swelling of the brain), particularly Japanese encephalitis, enterovirus 71 and other brain infections such as meningitis. His science communication work as the "Running Mad Professor" raises awareness of emerging brain infections, as well as helping raise hundreds of thousands of pounds for charity.

Early life and education
 
Solomon studied at the University of Oxford (Wadham College) where he obtained Bachelor of Arts, Bachelor of Medicine and Bachelor of Surgery degrees. He completed his clinical training at the John Radcliffe Hospital, also studying malaria in Mozambique. His PhD was for studies on the central nervous system infections in Vietnam, under the supervision of Nicholas White and John Newsom-Davis.

Career
In 1990, Solomon was house officer to David Weatherall at the Nuffield Department of Medicine in the John Radcliffe Hospital, Oxford. With the support of a Wellcome Trust Training Fellowship, he studied central nervous system infections at the Oxford University Clinical Research Unit in Vietnam (1994-7). In 1998, he became clinical lecturer in neurological science at the University of Liverpool with honorary positions in the Department of Medical Microbiology and at the Liverpool School of Tropical Medicine.

With the support of a Wellcome Trust Career Development Fellowship (1998–2004), he trained in arbovirology (the study of viruses transmitted by arthropods, such as mosquitoes) at the University of Texas Medical Branch, Galveston, Texas, with Alan Barrett. Solomon became clinical senior lecturer in neurological science at the University of Liverpool in 2005 and was awarded a UK Medical Research Council Senior Clinical Fellowship to continue his studies on Brain Infections.

He set up the Liverpool Neurological Infectious Diseases course in 2007, which has since run annually. He was appointed Professor of Neurological Science in 2007, and in 2010 became director of the newly formed Institute of Infection and Global Health. In 2014 he was appointed director of the UK Government's National Institute for Health Research Health Protection Research Unit in Emerging and Zoonotic Infections. This unit works on a number of emerging infections, including the Ebola virus. Solomon was awarded the Royal College of Physicians' Linacre Lectureship in 2006, and in 2015 its Moxon Medal; this is awarded every three years for "outstanding observation and research in clinical medicine".

Solomon was appointed Commander of the Order of the British Empire (CBE) in the 2021 Birthday Honours for services to neurological and emerging infections research.

Research
Solomon's research is on emerging brain infections, especially encephalitis (inflammation and swelling of the brain, usually caused by a virus). He is an expert on Japanese encephalitis, an emerging infectious disease that is a zoonosis spread from animals to humans by mosquitoes. He showed that Japanese encephalitis virus can cause an illness with leg paralysis which could be confused for polio. He also highlighted the importance of dengue, a related mosquito-borne virus, as a cause of neurological disease. He works on the origins, evolution, and spread of Japanese encephalitis. He has played a major role in the global campaign to control Japanese encephalitis through vaccination. This included developing the Liverpool Outcome Score for quantifying the disability caused by Japanese encephalitis and helping produce the WHO Surveillance Standards for detecting the disease. He is also an expert on enterovirus 71, which causes hand foot and mouth disease and encephalitis. He works on improving the diagnosis, better understanding the disease mechanisms, and strengthening clinical management.

Science communication and public engagement
As the "Running Mad Professor" he has increased awareness of encephalitis, whilst also helping to raise hundreds of thousands of pounds for the Encephalitis Society, for which he Chairs the Professional Advisory Panel. At the 2010 London Marathon where he raised more than £20,000, he won a Guinness World Record for the fastest Marathon Dressed as a Doctor. The "Running Mad Professor" video showing his training for the marathon has had more than 20,000 hits.

He has given numerous public lectures, including the Shrewsbury School Scholars Day Lecture, 2012, and the Emry's Jones Lecture at Merchant Taylors' School. To increase public and patient involvement in the Institute of Infection and Global Health, he established the Saturday Science Programme at World Museum Liverpool.

To mark the first World Encephalitis Day, creation of the Encephalitis Society, he initiated the "World’s Biggest Brain", winning a Guinness World Record for the largest human image of an organ.

At TEDx Liverpool 2014, he gave a talk on "Sex, Drugs and Emerging Viruses", appearing alongside Beermat Entrepreneur Mike Southon, and educationalist Sir Ken Robinson.

Tom Solomon also writes for The Guardian and The Independent newspapers and The Conversation on issues relating to biomedical science, particularly on emerging infections, neuroscience, and women in science, and appears on television and radio. He discussed the threat to the UK of Ebola virus with Andrew Neal on BBC Television's The Sunday Politics. On BBC Radio 4's Great Lives he discussed the children's author Roald Dahl, whose fascination with medical science impacted both on his life and his writing.

References

External links
University of Liverpool Staff Pages, Professor Tom Solomon

Year of birth missing (living people)
Living people
British neurologists
British virologists
Alumni of Wadham College, Oxford
Academics of the University of Liverpool
Fellows of the Academy of Medical Sciences (United Kingdom)
Commanders of the Order of the British Empire